The Highlands Motorsport Park is a motor racing circuit in Cromwell, Otago, New Zealand. Opened in 30 March 2013, the facility features a  circuit.

Circuit

The circuit offers on and off track driving, an outdoor go-kart track, off-road buggy driving, a sculpture park and "The Nose" restaurant. It is also the home of the New Zealand National Motorsport Museum, and displays machinery including ex-Formula One cars.

In early 2016, Highlands acquired the only Aston Martin Vulcan in the Southern Hemisphere, and one of only 24 worldwide, for $4.2 million. The car is the most expensive production vehicle in New Zealand, It is currently on display at the National Motorsport Museum at the park. In 2016 the park introduced the Highlands Festival of Speed, held annually in mid-January.

Layout configurations

Highlands 101 
The Highlands 101 was an endurance race held annually at the Highlands Motorsport Park from 2013 to 2016, in conjunction with the final round of the Australian GT Championship.

Past winners

Lap records

the unofficial all-time track record is 1:23.753, set by Liam Lawson on 16 January 2022. The official race lap records at the Highlands Motorsport Park are listed as:

Notes

References

External links
Official website

Motorsport venues in New Zealand
Cromwell, New Zealand
Tourist attractions in Otago